This is a list of titles by comic book publisher Marvel Comics that are collected in the smaller digest sized format, rather than the standard American comic book size format that they were (at most) originally published in.

List

Notes

External links
Marvel Digest at the Marvel Masterworks Resource Home Page

Digests
Comic book digests